Clayton Station is a  pastoral lease operating as a cattle station in far north South Australia. Clayton Station is located at the south end of the Birdsville Track. Clayton also provides a public camping ground.

References

Stations (Australian agriculture)